Ruby Tui (born 13 December 1991) is a New Zealand rugby union player. She competed internationally when the national rugby sevens team won the silver medal at the 2016 Summer Olympics tournament. She won a gold medal in rugby sevens at the 2020 Summer Olympics. She was a member of the Black Ferns team that won the 2021 Rugby World Cup.

Career

Sevens
Tui made her sevens debut in 2012 in Fiji and has been a part of the national setup ever since. Tui has been described as a "powerful and aggressive prop". She is a product of the Go4Gold campaign of the New Zealand Rugby Union.

Tui was named as a non-travelling reserve for the Black Ferns Sevens squad to the 2022 Commonwealth Games in Birmingham.

Fifteens
In November 2021, Tui was named in the Chiefs squad for the inaugural season of Super Rugby Aupiki.

Tui was named in the Black Ferns squad for the 2022 Pacific Four Series and made her international debut against Australia at Tauranga on 6 June. She scored a brace of tries against Canada at the Pacific Four Series.

She was selected for the August test series against Australia for the Laurie O'Reilly Cup.

She was named in the Black Ferns 2021 Rugby World Cup 32-player squad. She subsequently participated in a number of games at the World Cup, including the final, which was won by the Black Ferns. After receiving her gold medal she spotted a young girl in the crowd and gave her the medal. The 11-year-old recipient had recently recovered from leukemia and had been introduced to Tui at fan engagement event earlier in the week. Tui was presented with a replacement gold medal at the World Rugby Awards in Monaco in November 2022.

On 27 September 2022 she released her autobiography Straight Up.

Achievements and honours 

 2017, Canada Sevens Langford dream team.
 2019, HSBC Dream Team for the 2019 series.
 2019, World Rugby Women's Sevens Player of the Year.
 2022 World Rugby Women’s 15s Breakthrough Player of the Year.
 2022 World Rugby Women's 15s Dream Team of the Year.

Personal life
Tui was born in Wellington in 1991 to Marion Mouat and Vaki Tui. Her father is Samoan and she is of Irish and Scottish heritage on her mother's side. Her parents separated when she was eight. She was educated at John Paul II High School in Greymouth.

Tui received a scholarship to study at Aoraki Polytechnic, where she completed a Diploma in Sport in 2013.

Since 2019, Tui has been in a relationship with former Mai FM host Dani Fennessy.

References

External links
 

1991 births
New Zealand female rugby union players
New Zealand women's international rugby union players
New Zealand female rugby sevens players
New Zealand women's international rugby sevens players
Rugby sevens players at the 2016 Summer Olympics
Olympic rugby sevens players of New Zealand
Rugby union players from Christchurch
Living people
New Zealand sportspeople of Samoan descent
New Zealand people of Scottish descent
New Zealand people of Irish descent
Canterbury rugby union players
Olympic silver medalists for New Zealand
Olympic medalists in rugby sevens
Medalists at the 2016 Summer Olympics
Rugby sevens players at the 2018 Commonwealth Games
Commonwealth Games competitors for New Zealand
Olympic gold medalists for New Zealand
Rugby sevens players at the 2020 Summer Olympics
Medalists at the 2020 Summer Olympics
People educated at John Paul II High School, Greymouth
Rugby union players from Wellington City

New Zealand LGBT sportspeople
LGBT rugby union players
People educated at Wellington East Girls' College